Pumao is an urban locality in Tirap district, Arunachal Pradesh, India. As per the 2011 Census of India, Pumao has a total population of 4,934 people including 2,454 males and 2,480 females.

Pumao is militancy affected area with both militants and security forces' frequent actions.

References 

Cities and towns in India